Trachysida is a genus of beetles in the family Cerambycidae, containing the following species:

 Trachysida aspera (LeConte, 1873)
 Trachysida mutabilis (Newman, 1841)

References

Lepturinae